"F with U" is a song by American rapper Kid Ink. The song was released on April 7, 2017 by Tha Alumni Music Group, 88 Classic and RCA Records, as the lead single from his EP 7 Series (2017). The hip hop track was produced by frequent collaborators DJ Mustard and J Holt, along with Hitmaka and vocals by Ty Dolla Sign. The song interpolates Tamia's "So Into You" as its chorus.

Music video
The music video was released May 4, 2017. Amber Rose made a cameo.

Charts

Weekly charts

Year-end charts

References

2017 singles
2017 songs
Kid Ink songs
Ty Dolla Sign songs
RCA Records singles
Song recordings produced by Mustard (record producer)
Songs written by Mustard (record producer)
Songs written by Kid Ink
Songs written by Tim Kelley
Songs written by Ty Dolla Sign
Songs written by Bob Robinson (songwriter)